VFT, an abbreviation, may refer to:

Variable frequency transformer, a type of electricity transformer
Venus Flytrap, a variety of carnivorous plant
Vertical fire-tube boiler, a heat-transfer device used in steam engines
Very Fast Train, a proposed high-speed railway in Australia
Virtual field trip, a method used in online education
Virtual function table, a mechanism used in programming language